Christmas for Cowboys is the twelfth studio album and first Christmas album by Australian country music artist Troy Cassar-Daley. The album was released 6 November 2020 and peaked at number 13 on the ARIA Charts.

The album featured seven Christmas standard and three originals, including "Christmas for a Broken Family", which features his 18-year-old daughter, Jem.

Upon release, Cassar-Daley said "Christmas is a very special time of year for our family and music has always played a big part in Christmas family gatherings with all sides of our family tree. Getting a chance to share songs I've loved to sing for years, from backyards in Grafton and Brisbane to Christmas Carol events all over Australia, means a lot to me… and this collection gives you a good idea of the songs I've covered, whether sitting around with guitars or playing them with an orchestra."

Reception
Jeff Jenkins from Stack Magazine said "Like an Aussie version of Randy Travis, Cassar-Daley has a classic country crooner's voice – perfect for this material."

Track listing

Charts

Release history

References

2020 albums
Troy Cassar-Daley albums
Sony Music Australia albums
Christmas albums by Australian artists